The Visa Championship Series was an annual series of athletics meets organised by the USA Track & Field.

Meetings 
Meetings in 2012

Indoor

Outdoor

External links
Official website from USATF

Track and field competitions in the United States